USS Get There (SP-579) was a United States Navy section patrol craft in commission from 1917 to 1919.
 
Get There was built as a private motor yacht of the same name in 1916 by Wood & McClure at City Island, the Bronx, New York. On 28 June 1917, the U.S. Navy acquired her under a free lease from her owners, J. S. Bache and F. L. Richards of New York City, for use as a section patrol boat during World War I. The Navy took delivery of her on 14 July 1917 and she was commissioned as USS Get There (SP-579) on 10 August 1917.

Assigned to the 3rd Naval District, Get There served on section patrol and general transportation duties in New York Harbor for the remainder of World War I except for winter periods, when she was laid up in the marine basin at the New York Navy Yard.

Get There was decommissioned at New York City on 6 March 1919. The Navy returned her to her owners on 13 March 1919.

Notes

References

Department of the Navy Naval History and Heritage Command Online Library of Selected Images: U.S. Navy Ships: USS Get There (SP-579), 1917-1919. Originally the civilian motor boat Get There, built in 1916
NavSource Online: Section Patrol Craft Photo Archive: Get There (SP 579)

Patrol vessels of the United States Navy
World War I patrol vessels of the United States
Ships built in City Island, Bronx
1916 ships
Individual yachts